CamFind is a visual search and image recognition mobile app developed by Image Searcher, Inc. in 2013 under CEO, Dominik Mazur. Powered by their api, CloudSight, it allows users to identify any item just by taking a picture with their smartphone, providing a range of information including related images, local shopping results, price comparisons and web results. It has been downloaded more than 8 million times and has identified over 350 million images.

As of April 2015, CamFind's newest 4.0 release made it the first mobile visual search engine to include social features, such as the ability to like and favorite images shared around the world, as well as new 'live' and 'popular' image stream feeds.

References

External links
 Official Website

Image processing software
Android (operating system) software
IOS software